Ryu Kyung-soo (born 12 October 1992) is a South Korean actor. He is known for his roles in the drama series Confession (2019) and Itaewon Class (2020). He also appeared in the films A Resistance (2019) and Hostage: Missing Celebrity (2021).

Career
In March 2019, Ryu joined the recurring cast of the series Confession in the role of Han Jong-goo, a suspect in the Eun Seo-gu murder case. 

In 2020, Ryu was cast in the series Itaewon Class where he played the role ex-gangster Choi Seung-kwon, one of "Dan Bam's" employees and Park Sae-ro-yi's (Park Seo-joon) friend and former cell-mate. The same year, he appeared in KakaoTV's Lovestruck in the City.   

In 2021, he appeared in the Netflix original series Hellbound as a cult priest. He is set to star in another Netflix original series Glitch as well as in the Netflix original film Jung-i.

Filmography

Film

Television series

Web series

Web shows

Hosting

Awards and nominations

References

External links

 
 
 Ryu Kyung-soo on Daum 

21st-century South Korean male actors
South Korean male television actors
South Korean male film actors
South Korean male web series actors
Living people
People from North Gyeongsang Province
1992 births
Chung-Ang University alumni